Parthiban Kanavu is a 1960 Indian Tamil-language historical fiction film, directed by D. Yoganand. The film stars Vyjayanthimala, Gemini Ganesan and S. V. Ranga Rao, with Ragini, S. V. Subbaiah, Kumari Kamala, T. S. Balaiah, P. S. Veerappa and S. A. Ashokan in supporting roles. It is based on the 1942 historical novel of the same name, written by Kalki Krishnamurthy. The film also had actor K. Balaji in a special appearance and actress B. Saroja Devi as an extra.

Parthiban Kanavu was produced by V. Govindarajan under his Jubilee Films. Upon release, the film was well received by critics, where it won the Best Feature Film in Tamil at the 8th National Film Awards. In 2011, the film was criticised for its historical inaccuracies.

Plot 

In the 7th century AD. Parthiban, the Chola King, dies in battle leaving incomplete his desire to be free from the yoke of the Pallavas. His son Vikraman (Gemini Ganesan) is determined to fulfill his father's dream. He is captured by the Pallava king, Narasimhavarman (S. V. Ranga Rao) and exiled to an island where he is chosen as the king. Though he has banished him, Narasimhavarman, in fact, cares a great deal about Vikraman as the latter loves his daughter Kundhavi (Vyjayanthimala). Vikraman returns to the mainland to see his mother and is attacked by robbers. Narasimhavaraman, in the guise of a sage and who has been helping Vikraman constantly, rescues him. Vikraman weds Kundhavi and rules over the independent Chola Kingdom, thus fulfilling his father's dream.

Cast 
Cast according to the film songbook and the opening credits of the film

Male cast
 Gemini Ganesan as Vikraman
 S. V. Ranga Rao as Mamallar
 T. S. Balaiah as Marappa Bhoopathi
 S. V. Subbaiah as Ponnan
 P. S. Veerappa as Kapala Bhairavan
 S. A. Ashokan as Parthiban
 Javar Seetharaman as Siruthondar
 Balaji as Mahendran
 G. Pattu Iyer as Appar
Female supporting cast
 Indira, Sakunthala, and Indirani John.

Male supporting cast
 P. S. Venkatachalam
 Pottai Krishnamoorthi
 T. V. Sivanatham
 Gemini Sampath
 M. Krishnamoorthi
 K. G. Arjunan
 C. R. Chandar
 Master Anantharaman
 Ilaiyoor Thiyagarajan
 (Late) G. M. Basheer
 Subramaniam, Manavalan

Female cast
 Vyjayanthimala as Kundavi
 Ragini as Valli
 K. Malathi as Arulmozhi
 B. Saroja Devi as Kamali
 Kamala Lakshmanan as Sivakami
 Radhabhai as Thiruvenkattu Nangai
Dance
 Jayanthi, Kamala, Jothi, RajamRajeswari, Mohana, Chandra, Shanthi, Rathnakumari, K. S. Kamala, Leela, and G. Kamala.

Production 
The film was many years in the making. Saroja Devi appeared as an extra as Kundavi's companion. These scenes began disappearing later. The production was halted for many years, meanwhile Saroja Devi had become a star and was no longer available for small roles. Later, her name appeared in the credits as a guest appearance. Maniyam, who was an associate of Kalki Krishnamurthy was chosen as the art director.

Soundtrack 
The soundtrack was composed by Vedha, with the lyrics by Kannadasan, Vindhan and A. Maruthakasi. The song "Andhi Mayanguthadi" is set in Yaman Kalyan raga.

Release and reception 
Parthiban Kanavu was released on 3 June 1960. Kanthan of Kalki said the novel had been adapted well for the screen without losing out its taste. However, according to historian Randor Guy, the revealing of the yogi's identity in the beginning of the film was criticised as it did not build up the suspense, which had been the plus point of the novel, among the audience. He noted that this was a huge factor in the commercial failure of a good film, though the lead pair Vyjayanthimala and Ganesan proved to be an attractive pair and their scenes with excellent songs sustained interest in the film. At the 8th National Film Awards, Parthiban Kanavu won the award for Best Feature Film in Tamil. The film was dubbed into Telugu as Veera Samrajyam in 1961.

Controversy 
While analysing the 2011 science fiction film 7aum Arivu, where it was compared with other Tamil films about history and folklore, which had been historically inaccurate like Veerapandiya Kattabomman, Rajaraja Cholan and Parthiban Kanavu itself, the film historian S. Theodore Baskaran had quoted that, "The crew of Parthiban Kanavu — a film on the Pallava dynasty — did not even visit Mahabalipuram ruled by the Pallavas", while criticising the filmmakers, saying that "They do not even do basic research".

See also 
 List of longest films in India

References

External links 
 

1960 films
1960s historical films
1960s Tamil-language films
Adaptations of works by Kalki Krishnamurthy
Best Tamil Feature Film National Film Award winners
Films directed by D. Yoganand
Films set in ancient India
Films set in India
History of India on film
Indian epic films
Indian historical films